Statistics of Ekstraklasa for the 1956 season.

Overview
12 teams competed in the league and the championship was won by Legia Warsaw.

League table

Results

Top goalscorers

References
Poland – List of final tables at RSSSF 

Ekstraklasa seasons
1
Pol
Pol